Ten Eyck is a Dutch toponymic surname meaning "at the oak". Extinct in the Netherlands, most people belong to a single American family descended from Coenraadt Ten Eyck, who arrived from the Netherlands around 1651. It may refer to:

Albert A. Ten Eyck Brown (1878–1940), Albany-born architect in Atlanta
Egbert Ten Eyck (1779–1844), U.S. Representative from New York
Edward Ten Eyck (died 1958), champion rower and coach, son of James A. Ten Eyck
Jacob Coenraedt Ten Eyck (1705–1793), New York lawyer and politician 
Jacob H. Ten Eyck (1708–1776), New York merchant and politician 
James A. Ten Eyck (1851–1938), champion rower and coach, Ten Eyck Trophy namesake
John Adams Ten Eyck III (1893–1932), painter and etcher
John C. Ten Eyck (1814–1879), U.S. Senator from New Jersey
Karen TenEyck (born 1958), American scenic and graphic designer
Maude E. Ten Eyck (1902–1977), New York politician
Perry Ten Eyck (1907–1959), college basketball coach
Peter G. Ten Eyck (1873–1944), U.S. Representative from New York

See also
Ten Eyck Houses, original name of the Williamsburg Houses, in Williamsburg, Brooklyn
 Van Eyck, Dutch surname of similar origin

Dutch-language surnames
Toponymic surnames